The 13th Indiana Infantry Regiment was an infantry regiment in the Union Army during the
American Civil War.

Service 

The 13th Indiana Volunteer Infantry Regiment was originally accepted for state service for one year and was organized at Indianapolis for the U.S. service by volunteers from the companies in camp. It was one of the first four regiments volunteering from the state for three years and was mustered on June 19, 1861.

Attached to Rosecrans' Brigade, McClellan's Army of West Virginia, July 1861. 1st Brigade, Army of Occupation, West Virginia, to September 1861. Reynolds' Cheat Mountain Brigade, West Virginia, to November 1861. Milroy's Command, Cheat Mountain District, West Virginia, to January 1862. 2nd Brigade, Landers' Division, to March 1862. 2nd Brigade, Shields' 2nd Division, Banks' V Corps and Department of the Shenandoah to May 1862. 2nd Brigade, Shields' Division, Department of the Rappahannock, to July 1862. Ferry's 2nd Brigade, 2nd Division, IV Corps, Army of the Potomac, to September 1862. Ferry's Brigade, Division at Suffolk, Virginia, VII Corps, Department of Virginia, September 1862. Foster's Provisional Brigade, Division at Suffolk, VII Corps, to April 1863. 2nd Brigade, 1st Division, VII Corps, to July, 1863. 1st Brigade, Vogdes' Division, Folly Island, South Carolina, X Corps, Department of the South, to January 1864. 1st Brigade, Vogdes Division, Folly Island, South Carolina, Northern District, Department of the South, to February 1864. 1st Brigade, Vogdes' Division, District of Florida, to April 1864. 2nd Brigade, 3rd Division, X Corps, Army of the James, Department of Virginia and North Carolina, to May 1864. 2nd Brigade, 3rd Division, XVIII Corps, to June 1864. 3rd Brigade, 2nd Division, X Corps, to December 1864. 3rd Brigade, 2nd Division, XXIV Corps, to January 1865. 3rd Brigade, 2nd Division, Terry's Provisional Corps, Department of North Carolina, to March 1865. 3rd Brigade, 2nd Division, X Corps, Department of North Carolina, to September 1865.

Detailed service
The 13th Indiana Infantry Regiment left Indiana for West Virginia July 4.  Subsequent activity is as follows:

July 7–17, 1861: Campaign in West Virginia  

July 11:  Battle of Rich Mountain  

July 13:  Moved to Beverly, then to Cheat Mountain Pass

September 11–17:  Operations on Cheat Mountain 

September 12:  Cheat Mountain Pass

October 3–4:  Greenbrier River  

October 29-November 7:  Scouting Expedition through the Kanawha District  

December 11–14:  Expedition to Camp Baldwin 

December 13:  Action at Camp Allegheny  

December 18:  Moved to Green Springs Run  

until March 1862: Duty at Green Springs Run 

January 1–4:  Skirmishes at Bath, Hancock, Great Cacapon Bridge, Alpine Station and Sir John's Run 

March 5–15:  Advance on Winchester, VA 

March 22:  Kernstown . 

March 23:  Battle of Winchester  

April 17:  Occupation of Mt. Jackson 

May 7:  Summerville Heights  

May 12–21:  March to Fredericksburg 

May 25–30:   return to Front Royal 

June 9:  Battle of Port Republic 

June 29-July 2:  Moved to the Peninsula, VA 

until August 16:  Harrison's Landing 

August 16–23:  Moved to Fortress Monroe  

August 30 - June 27, 1863:  Suffolk, VA

October 3, 1862:  Reconnaissance to Franklin on the Blackwater

October 3:  Franklin  

December 12:  Zuni Minor's Ford  

January 8–10, 1863:  Expedition toward Blackwater 

January 30:  Action at Deserted House  

April 4:  Leesville

April 12-May 4:  Siege of Suffolk  

April 13:  Edenton, Providence Church and Somerton Roads 

April 17:  Suffolk 

April 24:  Edenton Road 

May 4:  Siege of Suffolk raised 

May 20:  Foster's Plantation 

June 24-July 7:  Dix's Peninsula Campaign 

July 1–7:  Expedition from White House to South Anna Bridge 

July 4:  South Anna Bridge  

July 28-August 3:  Moved to Folly Island, SC 

until February 1864:  Siege operations against Fort Wagner, Morris Island and against Fort Sumpter and Charleston, SC

September 7, 1863:  Capture of Forts Wagner and Gregg 

October 1863, to February 1864:  Stationed at Folly Island  

December 1863:  Reenlisted  

February 23, 1864:  Moved to Jacksonville, FL

until April 17:  Duty at Jacksonville, FL

May 4–28:  Ordered to Hilton Head, SC; then to Gloucester Point, VA. Butler's operations on Southside of the James River and against Petersburg and Richmond, Va., . 

May 5:  Occupation of Bermuda Hundred 

May 6–7:  Port Walthal Junction  

May 9–10:  Swift Creek 

May 10:  Chester Station  

May 12–16:  Operations against Fort Darling

May 14–16:  Battle of Drewry's Bluff  

May 16–28:  Bermuda Hundred  

May 28-June 1:  Moved to White House, then to Cold Harbor 

June 1–12:  Battles about Cold Harbor 

June 15–18:  before Petersburg  

June 16 to December 6:  Siege operations against Petersburg and Richmond  

July 30, 1864:  Mine Explosion, Petersburg 

June 19:  Non-Veterans left front   

June 24, 1864:  Mustered out

August 13–20:  Demonstration north of the James at Deep Bottom . 

August 14–18:  Battle of Strawberry Plains  

September 28–30:  Chaffin's Farm, New Market Heights

October 27–28:  Battle of Fair Oaks 

November 4–17:  Detached duty at New York City during Election of 1864  

December 7–27:  Expedition to Fort Fisher, NC 

January 3–15, 1865:  2nd Expedition to Fort Fisher, NC 

January 15:  Assault and capture of Fort Fisher  

February 19–20:  Town Creek 

February 22:  Capture of Wilmington 

March 1-April 26:  Campaign of the Carolinas 

March 6–21:  Advance on Goldsboro  

March 21:  Occupation of Goldsboro  

April 10–14:  Advance on Raleigh 

April 14:  Occupation of Raleigh  

April 26:  Bennett's House  

Surrender of Johnston and his army. 

until September:  Duty at various points in North Carolina  

September 5, 1865:  Mustered out

Casualties 
The original strength of the regiment was 1,047. Gain by recruits, 192; reenlistments, 148; unassigned recruits, 40; total, 1,427. The loss of death, 136; desertion, 103; unaccounted for 25. At its reorganization, the original strength was 980. Gain by recruits, 166; total 1,146. The loss of death, 98; desertion, 1; unaccounted for, 30.

The 13th Indiana Infantry lost during service 3 officers and 104 enlisted men killed and mortally wounded and 2 officers and 146 enlisted men by disease. Total 255.

Commanders
 Colonel Jeremiah C. Sullivan April 2, 1861
 Colonel Robert Sanford Foster April 30, 1862
 Colonel Cyrus Johnson Dobbs June 13, 1863

See also

 List of Indiana Civil War regiments
 Indiana in the Civil War
 Military Park (Indianapolis)

Notes

References
 Dyer, Frederick H. A Compendium of the War of the Rebellion (Des Moines, IA:  Dyer Pub. Co.), 1908.
 Terrell, William Henry Harrison, Report of the Adjutant General of the state of Indiana, Volume 2,  A.H. Connor [etc.] State Printer, 1865.
 The Union Army: Military Affairs and Regimental Histories of New Jersey,  Indiana, Illinois and Michigan, Volume 3, Madison, Wis. Federal Publishing Company, 1908.
Attribution

Further reading 
 Stevenson, David, ROLL OF HONOR, VOLUME I, K. E. COR, Indianapolis, 1864.

External links 
 13th Indiana Infantry in the American Civil War
 The Civil War Archive
 Civil War Photos: Regiments 6-24

Military units and formations established in 1861
Military units and formations disestablished in 1865
13
1861 establishments in Indiana